is a Japanese playwright, director, actor, and theatre producer. He is represented with Knockout. He is the director of the Japan Directors Association.

Filmography

Stage

Films

Anime films

Direct-to-video

TV dramas
 1999

 2001

 2002

 2003

 2004

 2005

 2006

 2007

 2008

 2009

 2010

 2011

 2012

 2013

 2014

 2015 

 2016 

 2017

Other television

Advertisements

References

External links
 
 – Knockout 
Yakutama.jp Ayumu Saito interview 
 

Japanese dramatists and playwrights
Japanese theatre directors
Japanese male voice actors
Japanese theatre managers and producers
People from Kushiro, Hokkaido
1964 births
Living people